Hesar (also Romanized as Ḩeşār and Ḩaşār; also known as Hisar) is a village in Liravi-ye Jonubi Rural District of Imam Hassan District of Deylam County, Bushehr province, Iran. At the 2006 census, its population was 806 in 185 households. The following census in 2011 counted 842 people in 224 households. The latest census in 2016 showed a population of 909 people in 234 households; it was the largest village in its rural district.

References 

Populated places in Deylam County